The Family and Parenting Institute is an independent charity that exists to make the UK a better place for families and children. It works with charities, businesses and public services to offer practical help to families. Its campaigns and research work focuses on building a "family friendly" society by offering insights into current and future family life. It runs the Family Friendly scheme which aims to help public and private organisations to better understand diverse families and meet their needs. The Family and Parenting Institute merged with the Daycare Trust in January 2013 and is now called the Family and Childcare Trust.

History 
The Family and Parenting Institute was established by the Labour Government as the 'National Family and Parenting Institute' in 1999, in response to a recommendation made in the Supporting Families Green Paper 1998. The Institute modified its operating name and brand to 'Family and Parenting Institute' in 2006, though the registered name remains the National Family and Parenting Institute.

Values 
The institute describes its values  as follows:
 Children are the future of society and families the bedrock. 
 A successful society depends on equipping children and other family members to meet the challenges of life.
 Families should be valued and active policies to support them pursued.
 Many different individual roles and family forms are capable of achieving a strong and successful family.

Current activities
As well as research, policy and public affairs, the Family and Parenting Institute is engaged in the following projects:

Parents’ Week 
The institute has run Parents’ Week since 1999 – an annual week-long celebration of parents and families through events and projects throughout the UK.  
At the launch of the 2011 Parents’ Week, Minister of State for Children and Families, Sarah Teather MP stated that parenting issues were at the “top of the agenda” for the Coalition Government

Family Friendly Scheme 
The Family Friendly scheme was launched by the institute in summer 2011 with the aim of making the UK a more family friendly society. Public, private and charity sector organisations joining in the scheme take a ‘Family Friendly pledge.’ They are then given a framework and resources for putting the pledge into action, focusing on customers, staff and services. Families themselves are given the opportunity to give feedback, via the scheme's website, on the quality of the service they received.
Current members include BT Group, easyJet, Barclays, Gatwick Airport, Gingerbread (charity), Fatherhood Institute, Grandparents Plus, Action for Prisoners’ Families, Contact A Family and a number of local Family Information Services.

Family Friendly Report Cards 
Since 2010, the Family and Parenting Institute has produced a “report card” on the UK's progress towards becoming a family friendly society. The 2010 report graded the UK on the following factors: costs of raising a child; maternity and paternity leave; elderly care; work-life balance; child and pensioner poverty; childhood commercialisation; neighbourhoods and green spaces and care of vulnerable children.
In 2010 the UK was graded an overall score of C−. 
However, in 2011, this was downgraded to D+. The economic squeeze on families was cited as the reason for the drop.

Commercialisation and Sexualisation of Childhood 
The Family and Parenting Institute contributed to the 2011 Bailey Review which examined the commercialisation and sexualisation of childhood by advertisers, corporates and the media.

Families in an Age of Austerity 
The Family and Parenting Institute is in the process of a two-year research project to track how the UK's economic problems are affecting family life. The project has launched two reports, Families in the Age of Austerity, in January 2011, and The Impact of Austerity Measures on Households with Children, in January 2012, in conjunction with the Institute for Fiscal Studies. Both received widespread coverage in the media. The project's final report is expected in January 2013.

Family Voice 
Family Voice is a project that started in 2011. It explores the use of social media to find out how to engage more with families.

Family Room 
The Family and Parenting Institute coordinates a coalition of 15 leading family charities to attend party political conferences in the autumn.

Associate Parliamentary Group for Parents and Families 
This all-parliamentary forum was established to provide impartial and progressive debate between politicians, parents’ groups, charities and researchers.

Notable Previous Activities

Early Home Learning Matters 
This project brought together the evidence focused on the vital role of parents in securing good outcomes for children, providing information on how to plan and deliver effective services to involve parents in their children's early learning.

Parenting Fund 
From March 2004 to March 2011, the Family and Parenting Institute managed the Parenting Fund  on behalf of the Department for Education (formerly the Department for Schools and Families). The fund reached hundreds of thousands of the UK's most vulnerable parents through grants made available to grassroots organisations. The impact of the Parenting Fund was assessed and a report published detailing the achievements. In particular: 
Impact was felt to be greatest around parental support, disability, fathers and managing conflict.
Mothers had a better understanding of the impact of domestic violence on their children as well as themselves, and were able to form supportive relationships with other mothers.
Separated/divorced parents in conflict were assisted to work better together in order to minimise the impact on their children.

Trustees
Chair: Christine Furnish Group Public Policy Director, Barclays, and former Chief Executive of the National Association of Pension Funds.
CEO: Dr Katherine Rake She is former Chief Executive of the Fawcett Society and Lecturer in Social Policy at the London School of Economics. In 2008, Katherine was appointed an OBE for services to equal opportunities.
Vice Chair: Anne Weyman OBE non-executive director of Islington Primary Care Trust and former Chief Executive of the Family Planning Association 
Vice Chair: David White Principal of Romyla Consulting and Chairman of EMCAS
Hon Treasurer: Laurie Edmans CBE Deputy Chairman of MGM Assurance and trustee of Quest School for Autistic Children
Nickie Aiken appointed Cabinet Member for Children and Young People in February 2010
Professor Tanya Byron consultant clinical psychologist and broadcaster
Dr John Coleman OBE Senior Research Fellow, Department of Education, University of Oxford, and Visiting Professor at the University of Bedfordshire
Penelope Gibbs Director, Out of Trouble, Prison Reform Trust
Paul Johnson Director of the Institute for Fiscal Studies, author and broadcaster on economics and public policy 
Chris Pond Director of Financial Capability at the Financial Services Authority, former Chief Executive of Gingerbread and former MP

Funding Sources
The Family and Parenting Institute receives funding from a number of sources including trusts, foundations, businesses and state grants.

In the press
The Family and Parenting Institute regularly receives coverage in the media. Its aims and work has been welcomed and supported by the Coalition Government led by Prime Minister David Cameron 

Recent coverage has included FPI's claims that the Coalition Government's cuts package will hit families with babies hardest, the FPI's focus on the costs of raising a child, and its findings on the impact of austerity measures on households with children

References

Other Relevant Links
 http://familyandchildcaretrust,org
 http://www.familyandparenting.org
 http://www.wearefamilyfriendly.org
 http://www.parentsweek.org.uk

Children's charities based in England
Organisations based in the London Borough of Camden